Los caballeros de la cama redonda (English: Round bed knights) is a 1973 Argentine comedy film directed and written by Gerardo Sofovich and Hugo Sofovich. The film starred Jorge Porcel and Alberto Olmedo.

Release
The film premiered in Argentina on March 22, 1973.

Cast
Jorge Porcel
Alberto Olmedo
Chico Novarro
Tristán
Adolfo García Grau
Mimí Pons
Mariquita Gallegos
Haydée Padilla
Elida Marchetta
Marcos Zucker
Carmen Morales
María Rosa Fugazot
Fidel Pintos
Eloísa Cañizares
Délfor
Moria Casán
Tita Coello
Marcia Bell
Hector Doldi
Javier Portales
Gabriela Acher

External links

1973 films
1970s Spanish-language films
1973 comedy films
Films set in Buenos Aires
Films shot in Buenos Aires
Argentine comedy films
1970s Argentine films